Maksim Alekseyevich Balayev (born 24 May 1974) is a Russian former football player.

External links
 

1974 births
Living people
Soviet footballers
Russian footballers
Association football forwards
Russian Premier League players
FC Zenit Saint Petersburg players
FC Zenit-2 Saint Petersburg players